A war memorial locomotive is a locomotive dedicated as a war memorial and usually given an appropriate name.  The following examples come from Britain and the First World War:

 London and North Western Railway - LNWR Claughton Class No. 1914 Patriot.  Name later removed and used on LMS Patriot Class No. (4)5500.
 London, Brighton and South Coast Railway – LB&SCR L class No. 333 Remembrance.
 Great Central Railway – GCR Class 9P (LNER Class B3) 4-6-0 No. 1165  (later LNER Nos 6165, 1496) Valour.  Name now carried by GB Railfreight Class 66 diesel locomotive 66715 Valour.

References

Types of monuments and memorials